Without Walls is the thirtieth and final studio album by American country music singer-songwriter Tammy Wynette. It was released on October 18, 1994, by Epic Records. It would turn out to be the final solo studio album Wynette released during her lifetime.

Commercial performance 
The album failed to chart on the Billboard Top Country Albums chart. The album's first single, "Girl Thang", peaked at No. 67 on the Billboard Hot Country Songs chart. The album's second single, "Every Breath You Take", did not chart.

Track listing

Personnel 
All tracks except "This Love":
 Eddie Bayers – drums
 Barry Beckett – keyboards, producer
 Paul Franklin – steel guitar
 Owen Hale – drums
 Dann Huff – electric guitar
 Elton John – keyboards
 Phil Naish – keyboards
 Don Potter – acoustic guitar
 Michael Rhodes – bass
 Tom Roady – percussion
 Brent Rowan – electric guitar
 Sting – bass
 Harry Stinson – backing vocals
 Willie Weeks – bass
 Dennis Wilson – backing vocals
 Curtis Young – backing vocals

Personnel on "This Love":
 D. Bishop – soprano sax
 John Clarke – guitar
 Peter May – drums
 Paul Moessl – keyboards, synthesizer, producer
 Cliff Richard – producer
 Frank Ricotti – percussion
 (20 personnel) – strings

Charts

References 

1994 albums
Tammy Wynette albums
Albums produced by Barry Beckett
Epic Records albums